Algerine Seamount is an undersea mountain in the North Atlantic Ocean, located about  south of Cape Race in the northeastern portion of the Sohm Abyssal Plain. To the east, Algerine Seamount is bounded by Birma Seamount.

Algerine Seamount is one of the seven named Fogo Seamounts. Its name is derived from SS Algerine, a Newfoundland steamship that participated in the recovery efforts following the sinking of the RMS Titanic. She had recovered one body after spending 3 weeks searching the area.

References

External links

Fogo Seamounts